Captain Jack (Native American) may refer to:

 Captain Jack, also known as Kintpuash, chief of the Modoc tribe of California and Oregon
 Captain Jack, also known as Nicaagat, chief of the Ute tribe of Colorado